Seneca is a unicorportated community in Gila County, Arizona, United States.

References

External links
 
 
 Seneca – ghosttowns.com

Ghost towns in Arizona
Populated places in Gila County, Arizona
Unincorporated communities in Arizona